Frank Walter Yallop (born 4 April 1964) is a British-Canadian professional soccer coach. Yallop is currently the head coach and sporting director of USL Championship side Monterey Bay FC.

He played 13 years in England for Ipswich, including the club's first three seasons in the Premier League. He also played in Major League Soccer (MLS) for the Tampa Bay Mutiny, and earned 52 caps for the Canada men's national soccer team.

He spent a further 13 years as coach in MLS for San Jose Earthquakes, LA Galaxy, and Chicago Fire, as well as three years coaching the Canadian men's national team. He has most recently been a coach and sporting director in the USL Championship, working with Phoenix Rising, Fresno FC, Las Vegas Lights, and Monterey Bay FC.

Early life
Yallop was born in Watford and spent his early childhood there before his father, a meat cutter by trade, joined a brother in Canada in 1974 bringing his wife and three children to Vancouver. Yallop continued playing in British Columbia, where he caught the eye of an Ipswich Town scout who invited Yallop to try out for Ipswich at age 14.

Club career

Ipswich Town (1983–1996) 
In 1983, at age 19, Yallop signed a professional contract with Ipswich Town, for whom he would play 385 games in all competitions, scoring 8 goals. He was part of the Ipswich squad that was relegated from the First Division in 1986, and of the squad that won promotion six years later to the new FA Premier League, where Ipswich stayed for three years before being relegated once again. Yallop remained at the club for a further season after this.

In the later years of his Ipswich career, he played alongside fellow Canadian Craig Forrest.

One of his eight goals for the Town came in February 1993 as they beat Premier League title favourites Manchester United 2–1 at Portman Road, a result which saw Ipswich occupy fourth place in the league and spark hopes of a late run to the title, but instead a slump in form followed and Ipswich finished 16th.

Tampa Bay Mutiny (1996–1998) 
After a lengthy career in England, Yallop returned to North America in 1996, when he signed with Major League Soccer and was drafted 57th overall by the Tampa Bay Mutiny in the MLS Inaugural Player Draft.

Yallop was given his only MLS All-Star honor with an appearance in the 1997 game, representing Tampa Bay on the Eastern Conference team.

After three seasons with the Mutiny, in which he served as captain and started nearly every game, Yallop retired from professional soccer at the end of the 1998 season. He was released from the Mutiny due to MLS shrinking their foreign player limit from 5 to 4 players per team. At the time of his retirement, Yallop was second on the team all-time in games played (88), games started (84), and minutes played (7,646).

During the 1999 season the team lost Jan Eriksson and R.T. Moore to injury and retirement respectively. The Mutiny petitioned the league to sign Yallop, who was still participating in player drills and could resume his career, but the league denied the request.

International career 
Missing out on Canada's only World Cup participation in 1986, Yallop only made his debut for Canada at 26 years of age in a May 1990 North American Championship match against the United States. Since this game strangely was not official his real debut came a few days later in the same tournament against Mexico. He earned 52 caps, scoring no goals. He has represented Canada in 27 FIFA World Cup qualification matches. His final international was a November 1997 World Cup qualification match against Costa Rica.

On 29 April 2005, Yallop was selected for induction into the Canadian Soccer Hall of Fame for his playing career. On 24 May 2012, Yallop was selected by the Canadian Soccer Hall of Fame as the right back of Canada's Best XI for the 1963-2012 era.

Coaching career

Early coaching career

After retiring following his 1998 season with the Tampa Bay Mutiny, Yallop was offered the opportunity to become an assistant coach for the club starting with the 1999 MLS season. In the interim period before the pre-season would begin, Yallop began his coaching career in 1998 as an assistant-coach under Lothar Osiander with the US Project-40 team, joining the team on a 5-game tour of England. Osiander joked that he brought Yallop on board because "I needed someone who knew how to drive on the other side of the road." Following the tour, he began his duties as an assistant coach for the Tampa Bay Mutiny. In 2000, he became chief assistant coach for D.C. United under Thomas Rongen. In December 2000, it had been reported that Yallop was considered as an early candidate to coach for his former team Tampa Bay Mutiny, but he did not make the final group of candidates.

San Jose Earthquakes (2001–2003)
In 2001, Yallop was named head coach for the San Jose Earthquakes, just two days before the MLS SuperDraft. He replaced Lothar Osiander, who he had briefly coached under just few years prior with Project-40. During the pre-season, Yallop acquired Jeff Agoos, Landon Donovan, Dwayne DeRosario, Manny Lagos, Ramiro Corrales and Ronnie Ekelund, as well as assistant coach Dominic Kinnear. Kinnear initially thought he was being recruited as a player, but Yallop asked his former teammate to join the club as an assistant manager. Kinnear would end his playing career to join Yallop's coaching staff. In his first year, Yallop proceeded to lead the San Jose Earthquakes to their first MLS Cup over California Clásico rivals LA Galaxy. Following the season, Yallop was named 2001 MLS Coach of the Year. The following year the Quakes would improve their regular season performance and finish in second place overall, however they would succumb to an upset in the first round of the MLS Playoffs against the Columbus Crew.

In 2003, the Earthquakes yet again improved upon their regular season form and finished as the best team in the West, and just two points shy of winning the Supporters Shield as the best regular season team. Yallop would lead the team to their second MLS title in the playoffs. MLS Cup 2003 is the Earthquakes' most recent appearance in the playoff final as well as the last time they won the trophy.

The 2004 season would prove to be the Quakes' worst season under Yallop, in which they vastly underperformed in the regular season and playoffs. The club finished 4th in the Western Conference and obtained the final playoff spot just two points ahead of Dallas Burn. In the playoffs the Earthquakes once again followed up a Championship season with a first round exit.

Canada (2004–2006)
On 16 December 2003 it was announced that Yallop would become head coach of the Canadian National Team starting on 1 January of the following year. On 7 June 2006, Yallop resigned as coach of the Canadian men's national soccer team, as he was announced as the new head coach of Los Angeles Galaxy.

Los Angeles Galaxy (2006–2007)
The Galaxy, which signed famed English star David Beckham under Yallop, failed to qualify for the play-offs in 2007, although Yallop has been defended for his part in that, with forward Alan Gordon, who played on the 2007 Galaxy team, stating "it had nothing to do with Frank. We had 11 guys come in and out of there in a couple months. We had no team chemistry. We had a bunch of individuals who were trying to hang on and make the best of it." On 4 November 2007 it was revealed that Yallop was being bought out of his contract with the Galaxy to become the head coach of the San Jose Earthquakes once again for the 2008 season, with Dutchman Ruud Gullit taking his place. The Galaxy received the Earthquakes' third-round pick in the 2008 MLS SuperDraft as compensation for Yallop's departure.

Return to San Jose Earthquakes (2008–2013)
Yallop led the new-era Earthquakes for five-and-a-half seasons before parting ways with the club on 7 June 2013. He compiled a 62–6–51 record and led the club to two postseason appearances (2010, 2012) and the 2012 Supporters' Shield. His combined 126 wins in two stints at the club is the most in team history as of 2015.

Chicago Fire (2013–2015)
In October 2013, Yallop was named Chicago Fire's new head coach and director of soccer. Chicago would finish second to last in the Eastern Conference in his first season in charge. The following season saw the team perform even worse, and the poor form would see Yallop was fired on 20 September 2015, with five matches left in the season. Chicago would finish the season worst in the East and the worst record in MLS overall. He compiled a 13–26–24 record with the Fire in what would be his last MLS coaching job to date.

Arizona United SC and Phoenix Rising FC (2016–2017)
Yallop was signed to a three-year contract as head coach and president of soccer operations of Arizona United SC on 23 December 2015. This was his first time managing a club in the USL. The team was renamed Phoenix Rising FC on 28 November 2016. After only four league matches played in the 2017 season, Yallop would resign from his positions on 24 April to rejoin his family in Northern California. Yallop would stay on to consult in the club's search for a replacement head coach. Frank's assistant Rick Schantz took over as interim manager before the eventual hiring of Patrice Carteron. Phoenix would finish the season in 5th place, good for their first ever playoff appearance.

Fresno FC (2018–2019)
Yallop was announced on 26 July 2017 as General Manager of the newly established Fresno FC, an expansion team for the 2018 USL season.

Las Vegas Lights FC (2020)
On 29 June 2020, Yallop was hired in a caretaker role to replace Eric Wynalda as head coach of Las Vegas Lights FC a month before the 2020 USL Championship season was set to resume. Yallop had made it official at the time of his hire that he would not pursue the head coaching role after the end of the season. Wynalda had managed Las Vegas for a single match of the 2020 USL season before a pause was brought on due to the COVID-19 pandemic. Las Vegas would finish the season fifth place out of five teams in their regional group, and fifteenth of eighteen teams in the Western Conference.

Monterey Bay FC (2021–)
On 22 April 2021, it was announced that Yallop would be serving as head coach for Monterey Bay FC in addition to acting as sporting director. Former Earthquakes captain Ramiro Corrales would serve as Yallop's sole assistant coach. Corrales played under Yallop during both of the manager's stints with the San Jose Earthquakes. Monterey Bay FC began their first USL Championship season in March 2022. The club achieved their first professional win on 29 March, in their third match of the 2022 USL Championship season.

Coaching record

Honours

Player
Ipswich Town
Football League Second Division: 1992
Tampa Bay Mutiny
MLS Supporters' Shield: 1996

Individual
 Ipswich Town Player of the Year: 1987–88
MLS All-Star: 1997
Canadian Soccer Hall of Fame: Inducted 2005
Canadian Soccer Hall of Fame Best XI in 50 Years: 1963-2012

Coach
Individual
MLS Cup: 2001, 2003
MLS Coach of the Year: 2001, 2012
MLS Supporters' Shield: 2012

References

External links
 
  / Canada Soccer Hall of Fame
 

1964 births
Living people
Footballers from Hertfordshire
Soccer players from Vancouver
English emigrants to Canada
Canada men's national soccer team managers
Canadian soccer players
Canada men's international soccer players
Canadian expatriate soccer players
Ipswich Town F.C. players
Blackpool F.C. players
Tampa Bay Mutiny players
English Football League players
Premier League players
Major League Soccer players
Expatriate footballers in England
Expatriate soccer players in the United States
Canadian soccer coaches
San Jose Earthquakes coaches
LA Galaxy coaches
Canada Soccer Hall of Fame inductees
Major League Soccer All-Stars
Chicago Fire FC coaches
1991 CONCACAF Gold Cup players
1993 CONCACAF Gold Cup players
1996 CONCACAF Gold Cup players
D.C. United non-playing staff
Major League Soccer coaches
Association football defenders
Phoenix Rising FC coaches
Las Vegas Lights FC coaches
Canadian expatriate sportspeople in England
Monterey Bay FC
Sportspeople from Watford